Douglas Samuel Thomas Williams (born 3 July 1919, year of death missing) was an Australian cricketer. He played eight first-class matches for Western Australia between 1948/49 and 1951/52. Williams is deceased.

See also
 List of Western Australia first-class cricketers

References

External links
 

1919 births
Year of death missing
Australian cricketers
Western Australia cricketers
Claremont Football Club players